The First Vision is the debut video album by American singer Mariah Carey. It is a collection of music videos, live performances, and behind-the-scenes footage detailing the creation of Carey's debut album Mariah Carey (1990).

Music videos of four Mariah Carey singles—"Vision of Love", "Love Takes Time", "Someday", and "I Don't Wanna Cry"—are featured on this collection; snippets of the album's other single, "There's Got to Be a Way", are also included. The collection also includes the debut showcase (the first public showing of a recording artist to the press and the media) of Carey at the Club Tatou. Carey performed her singles "Vision of Love" and "Love Takes Time", her album track "Vanishing", and a cover of Aretha Franklin's "Don't Play That Song (You Lied)". She also performed "Someday" at this showcase, but it is not included in this collection.

Behind-the-scenes footage includes Carey rehearsing for Saturday Night Live, goofing off with friends like Trey Lorenz, and giving candid interviews detailing her life, dreams, and music. She is also seen singing brief snippets of the album track "All in Your Mind" and the Jackson 5's "Who's Lovin' You". Performances of "Don't Play That Song" and "Vanishing" from this concert would later be used for audio release as official live versions on the Australian special edition of the Mariah Carey album.

On July 17, 2020, Carey's debut showcase at Club Tatou was released as an extended play titled The Live Debut - 1990, in commemoration of the 30th-anniversary of the Mariah Carey album, as well as Carey celebrating 30 years in the music industry.

Summary
The First Vision contains Carey's first three music videos, two live performances, various film footage, and her responses to interview questions. It opens with the "Vision of Love" music video. Carey explains how she began singing as a young girl and credits her mother for being a musical inspiration. She describes how gospel music significantly influences her, and that it is expressed in her songs' lyrics and musical arrangements. In a live performance at Club Tatou, Carey performs "Vanishing", a track from Mariah Carey that was not released as a single. She is accompanied by a piano player and three background singers, Patrique, Billy, and Trey Lorenz. They rehearse for Carey's appearance on It's Showtime at the Apollo by singing "Who's Loving You". Carey states that she always dreamed of singing at the Apollo Theater because some of her idols like Aretha Franklin performed there. She gives thanks to the theater's audience for accepting her and defines it as her "arrival". Carey reflects on working odd jobs before getting a record deal and recounts how "Love Takes Time" came to be included on her debut album. The music video for the song is shown, after which Carey details her experience filming it.

Carey prepares for her October, 27, 1990, Saturday Night Live performance with her background singers and describes their close friendship. They rehearse by singing "All in Your Mind", another Mariah Carey track, on stage. Additional rehearsal footage is shown while the studio version of the song plays in the background. Back at Club Tatou, Carey performs a cover version of Franklin's "Don't Play That Song (You Lied)". She answers further questions about how success makes her feel and how she looks forward to completing the writing process for her second album, Emotions. Footage of Carey performing "I Don't Wanna Cry" is subsequently shown. As The First Vision preceded the filming of that song's music video, an alternative preview is provided with Carey singing amidst red-orange lights on an empty stage. She describes the lyrical inspiration for "Someday" and how she worked with its director to create a concept for the music video. The extended version which promoted the song's 12-inch single is then shown. In the concluding interview segment, Carey expresses gratitude and fulfillment for how she is able to share her music with the world. As the credits roll, "There's Got to Be a Way" plays in the background. In non-VHS releases, her performances of "Love Takes Time" and "Vision of Love" at Club Tatou are shown afterward.

Release 
Sony Music Video issued The First Vision on VHS in the United States on January 22, 1991, and in the United Kingdom on March 4, 1991. A LaserDisc edition followed on August 25, 1992, and a DVD was released in Japan on November 17, 2004. Sony Pictures Entertainment made it available for digital download and rental in the United States on December 7, 2021. Club Tatou performances of "Don't Play That Song" and "Vanishing" were also included on disc two of a 1991 Australian edition of Mariah Carey and all were released for digital download and streaming as part of the 2020 extended play The Live Debut – 1990.

Critical reception

Critics commented on the video's presentation. According to AllMusic writer Ashley S. Battel, The First Vision acts as a compelling prelude to Carey's stardom. Forrest Spencer of AllMovie remarked it provides insights into her early career that fans would appreciate. Los Angeles Times writer Dennis Hunt thought the interview segment is the weakest portion because Carey "offers no in-depth answers to basic questions". Rolling Stones Jim Farber felt she comes across as uninspiring. He likened the video to an advertisement for a phone sex line due to Carey's "saucerlike eyes, serpentine hair, and maul-me expressions". Hunt agreed, remarking the camera's focus on her resembles production choices typically seen in a Playboy video.

Carey's live performances were subject to critical review. In his biography of her, author Chris Nickson considered them the best part of the video. Hunt felt they provide Carey ample opportunity to showcase her vocal abilities. Peoples Ralph Novak complimented the cover of "Don't Play That Song" as he felt its lyrics allow Carey's voice to come across more powerfully than in her self-written material. Similarly, Lynn Voedisch of the Chicago Sun-Times said she exudes emotion when singing it. Reviewing in 2020, NME writer Eddy Lim described Carey's performance of "Vision of Love" as extraordinary and Jon Caramanica of The New York Times stated that "Vanishing" showcases "her voice in its full, pure, almost unfathomable luster".

Commercial performance
The First Vision debuted at number six on the Billboard Top Music Videos chart in the March 2, 1991, issue. It peaked at number two a month later and remained on the chart for the next 44 weeks. According to Billboard, it was the fifth best-selling music video of 1991 in the United States. The Recording Industry Association of America certified it Platinum for shipments of 100,000 copies and the Canadian Recording Industry Association (CRIA) certified it Gold for 5,000 units. When the CRIA retired video certifications in 2021, it remained Carey's only certified video in that country.

In the United Kingdom, the video debuted at number 29 on the Music Week Music Video chart dated March 23, 1991. Three years later amid Carey's simultaneous number ones on the albums (Music Box), singles ("Without You"), and music video charts (Here Is Mariah Carey), The First Vision entered at number 37 on the Official Charts Company's music videos chart dated April 2, 1994. It peaked at number 24 for the week ending June 11, 1994, and continued to chart as late as July 1995.

Track listings
All tracks are written by Mariah Carey and Ben Margulies, except where noted. Although track listings vary between editions, the only actual difference is the addition of "Love Takes Time" (live) and "Vision of Love" (live) in non-VHS releases.

VHS edition 1 (42 minutes)

VHS edition 2 (42 minutes)

LaserDisc edition (49 minutes)

DVD edition (49 minutes)

Credits

The First Vision
 Jeb Brien – producer, director, segment director
 Judy Minot – editor

Music videos
"Love Takes Time"
 Bojan Bazelli – director of photography
 Sean Fullan – editor
 Ron Kay – producer
 Wayne Maser – co-director

"Someday"
 Lexi Godfrey – producer
 Larry Jordan – director
 Judy Minot – editor
 Daniel Pearl – director of photography

"Vision of Love"
 Bojan Bazelli – director of photography
 Ron Kay – producer
 Tom Muldoon – editor

Additional footage
Club Tatou performances
 Jeb Brien – producer
 David Greenwald – editor
 Jim Gucciardo – producer 
 Ed Stephenson – director of photography

"I Don't Wanna Cry"
 Michael B. Borofsky – producer

Interview segment
 David Hewitt – on-site recording
 Kevin Moy – assistant editor
 RVI/Rutt Videos Inc. – post-production
 Tim Smith – camera, lighting
 Sync Sound – audio post-production
 Deb Turco – assistant editor

Saturday Night Live and Apollo segments
 Goochinetti Productions – producer
 Ed Stephenson – camera

Charts and certifications

References

1991 video albums
Mariah Carey video albums
Live video albums
Music video compilation albums
1991 live albums
1991 compilation albums